Saint Alypius the Stylite was a seventh-century ascetic saint.  He is revered as a monastic founder, an intercessor for the infertile, and a protector of children.  During his lifetime he was a much sought-after starets (guide in the Christian spiritual life).

Life

Alypius was born in the city of Hadrianopolis in Paphlagonia. His mother, who had been widowed early, was very pious. She sent her son to be educated by the bishop Theodore, gave all of her livelihood to the poor, and herself became a deaconess and lived an ascetic life. 

Alypius yearned to practice the life of a hermit, but Bishop Theodore would not give him permission to do so. Alypius built a church in honour of the Great Martyr Saint Euphemia the All-Praised on the site of a dilapidated pagan temple.  He erected a pillar beside the church and lived atop it for the majority of his adult life.  Two monasteries were built beside his pillar, one for monks and one for nuns, and Saint Alypius served as spiritual director of both.  It is claimed that, after standing upright for fifty-three years, Alypius found his feet no longer able to support him, but instead of descending from his pillar lay down on his side and spent the remaining fourteen years of his life in that position. Alypius died in 640, at the claimed age of 118.

Veneration
Alypius is venerated in the Eastern Orthodox Church and those Eastern Catholic Churches which follow the Byzantine Rite, as well as the Roman Catholic Church on November 26. For those churches which follow the Julian Calendar November 26 currently falls on December 9 of the modern Gregorian Calendar. After his death his relics were interred in the Church of St. Euphemia which he had built. His head is preserved in the Monastery of Koutloumousiou on the Mount Athos.

Alypius is recognised as one of the three great stylite ascetics along with Simeon Stylites the Elder and Daniel the Stylite. Herbert Thurston says of the Stylites that they did, in an age of terrible corruption and social decadence, impress the need of penance more than anything else could have done upon the minds and imagination of Eastern Christians.

See also

Foolishness for Christ
God: Sole Satisfier
Hermit
Poustinia
 Stylianos of Paphlagonia

References

External links
The Venerable Alypius the Stylite Prologue from Ochrid by St. Nikolaj Velimirović, Serbian Orthodox Church
Venerable Alypius the Stylite of Adrianopolis Orthodox icon and synaxarion
Translation of The Life of Alypius the Stylite (BHG 65)

Stylites
Greek hermits
Saints of medieval Greece
522 births
640 deaths
7th-century Christian saints
Longevity claims
People from Karabük Province